Neorapana grandis is a species of large predatory tropical sea snail,  a marine gastropod mollusks in the family Muricidae, the rock snails.

Distribution
This species is endemic to Ecuador, specifically to the Galapagos Islands.

Description
The shell of this species is 60 to 90 mm (2½ to 3½ inches) long, with brown scaly spiral ribbing.

References

 A. Myra Keen, Sea shells of tropical west America, 1971, Stanford University Press, Stanford, California

Muricidae
Endemic gastropods of the Galápagos Islands
Galápagos Islands coastal fauna
Gastropods described in 1835
Taxonomy articles created by Polbot